Aloa collaris is a moth of the family Erebidae. It was described by George Hampson in 1891. It is found in Hainan in China and in southern India.

References

Moths described in 1891
Erebid moths of Asia
Moths of Asia
Fauna of Hainan